Wagna is a municipality in the district of Leibnitz in Austrian state of Styria.  The ancient Roman town of Flavia Solva lies near what is today Wagna.

References

Cities and towns in Leibnitz District